Trioxsalen (trimethylpsoralen (TMP), trioxysalen (INN) or Trisoralen) is a furanocoumarin and a psoralen derivative.  It is obtained from several plants, mainly Psoralea corylifolia.  Like other psoralens it causes photosensitization of the skin.  It is administered either topically or orally in conjunction with UV-A (the least damaging form of ultraviolet light) for phototherapy treatment of vitiligo and hand eczema.  After photoactivation it creates interstrand cross-links in DNA, which can cause programmed cell death unless repaired by cellular mechanisms.  In research it can be conjugated to dyes for confocal microscopy and used to visualize sites of DNA damage.  The compound is also being explored for development of antisense oligonucleotides that can be cross-linked specifically to a mutant mRNA sequence without affecting normal transcripts differing at even a single base pair.

Trioxsalen (abbreviated as TMP) activated by UV-A exposure is commonly used in genetics research as an experimental mutagen. UV/TMP generates small deletions (~1-3 Kbp), but all base transitions and transversions can also be obtained.

References 

Furanocoumarins
O-methylated coumarins